In the New Old-Fashioned Way  was the highly anticipated second album from Spongebath Records' artists Fluid Ounces.  The album was recorded in a marathon two week session with producer Richard Dortch in Jackson, Mississippi.  All tracks were recorded live, with minimal overdubs. The album has a distinctive sound from other releases in the Ounces canon, and features mixing credits by Matt Mahaffey. The title of the album is the same as the last line of the chorus in the 1958 Brenda Lee song "Rockin' Around the Christmas Tree".

Due to Spongebath's long delay in releasing the album, the band decided in the interim to release the Vegetable Kingdom EP, a five song teaser of new material and B-sides. The B-sides included the songs "Stick in the Mud," "Sitting Beside Myself," and "Sucker." The song "Vegetable Kingdom" became a minor radio hit regionally. The EP proved to be the perfect teaser for INOFW, showcasing the band's evolving sound and dense, distinctive arrangements.

Although the album sold poorly (largely due to limited distribution channels and limited pressings), it was received very well critically and is often considered one of the finest Tennessee rock albums of the 1990s. It was re-released by Avex Trax in Japan in May 2001.

Track listing

 "Lend Me Your Ears" – 2:55
 "The Marvel Girl" – 1:53
 "Luxury" – 2:20
 "The Vegetable Kingdom – 4:17
 "Eleven: Eleven" – 3:28
 "The Drought" – 2:45
 "Bigger than the Both of Us" – 5:01
 "Go Lucky" – 3:38
 "Run Rabbit Run" – 4:48
 "Comfortable" – 3:09
 "The Ambiance" – 4:20
 "Have Fun" – 5:08
 "The Downscope, And The Boatcaptain" – 4:37
 "The Sucker" – 4:12 [Japanese Bonus track]

Personnel
Seth Timbs – piano, accordion, vocals
Brian Rogers – guitar, background vocals
Ben Morton – bass
Sam Baker – drums, background vocals
Richard Dortch – tracking
Matt Mahaffey – mixing
Tommy Dorsey – mastering
Brian Bottcher – artwork

References

Fluid Ounces albums
1999 albums